ISO/IEC 90003 Software engineering -- Guidelines for the application of ISO 9001:2008 to computer software is a guidelines developed for organizations in the application of ISO 9001 to the acquisition, supply, development, operation and maintenance of computer software and related support services.

This standard was developed by technical committee ISO/IEC JTC 1/SC 7 Software and systems engineering. 

ISO/IEC 90003 originally published as ISO 9000-3 for the first time in December 1997, was issued for the first time as an ISO/IEC 90003 in February 2004.

The review cycle of ISO 90003 is every 5 years.

Main requirements of the standard 
The ISO/IEC 90003:2014 adopts the ISO structure in 8 chapters in the following breakdown:
 Scope
 Normative references
 Terms and definitions
 Quality management system
 Management responsibility
 Resource management
 Product realization
 Measurement, analysis and improvement

See also 
 List of ISO standards
 List of IEC standards
 International Organization for Standardization

References

External links 
  ISO/IEC 90003—Software engineering -- Guidelines for the application of ISO 9001 to computer software
 ISO/IEC JTC 1/SC 7—Software and systems engineering

90003
Software quality